Gilford may refer to:

Places
 Gilford, County Down, Northern Ireland
 Gilford, Ontario, Canada
 Gilford, New Hampshire, U.S.
 Gilford Island, British Columbia, Canada
 Gilford Township, Michigan, U.S.

Other uses
 Gilford (surname)
 Gilford Motors, British bus assembler in the 1933 law case Gilford Motor Co Ltd v Horne

See also

Guildford (disambiguation)
Gildford, Montana